IL-13 or IL 13 can refer to:
 Interleukin 13
 Illinois's 13th congressional district
 Illinois Route 13